Black  Sun, Red Moon is the first novel by British author Rory Marron. 
It is published in two parts, with the second part titled Merdeka Rising.

The novel is set in Java at the end of World War II preceding the Indonesian War of Independence.  Japan is about to surrender and the Imperial officers stationed in Indonesia must make decisions about the Dutch colony they took over. Indonesian rebel leaders want Japan to grant their country independence before the Japanese surrender. Meanwhile, Dutch leaders expect British forces to help them recover their colony.

External links
 Author's official website

2013 British novels
Novels set in Indonesia
Novels set on islands
Pacific theatre of World War II
Novels set during World War II
Novels set in Java